The 1988 Maui Invitational Tournament was an early-season college basketball tournament that was played, for the 5th time, from November 25 to November 27, 1988. The tournament, which began in 1984, was part of the 1988-89 NCAA Division I men's basketball season.  The tournament featured a particularly loaded field (three of the eight teams were ranked in the AP top 10 and a fourth in the top 20) and the eventual national champion for the second straight season. Games were played at the Lahaina Civic Center in Maui, Hawaii. The No. 3 Michigan Wolverines won the tournament by defeating Vanderbilt, Memphis State, and No. 4 Oklahoma. It was the second title for the program and its head coach Bill Frieder.

Bracket

References

Maui Invitational Tournament
Maui Invitational